Aeropostal Alas de Venezuela Flight 108 was a short-haul flight from La Chinita International Airport in Maracaibo, Venezuela to Santa Barbara Ed-L Delicias Airport that crashed on March 5, 1991.

Aircraft 
The aircraft used on Flight 108 was a McDonnell Douglas DC-9, which has been in service with Aeropostal for 14 years; the aircraft was manufactured in 1976.

The "Guillotine of Los Andes" 
The Páramo "Los Torres" is known among Venezuelan pilots as  The Guillotine ("Russian roulette") of the Andes. In literal sense, it is a steep, usually foggy mountain that pilots had trouble avoiding before proper ground proximity warning systems were installed in planes. Prior to Flight 108, two other commercial aircraft had crashed near "The Guillotine". On December 15, 1950, an Avensa Douglas DC-3 flying from Mérida to Caracas crashed, killing all 28 passengers and 3 crew. Ten years later, on December 15, 1960, a Ransa flight crashed, killing all of its passengers.

Accident 

Flight 108 took off from La Chinita International Airport with 45 passengers and crew. Several minutes later, the McDonnell Douglas DC-9-32 crashed on the side of a foggy mountain near "The Guillotine" near La Valesa in the La Aguada sector of the Páramo Los Torres and burst into flames. All 45 people on board died.

Cause 
An investigation into the accident found that the cause of the crash was pilot error. The pilots inadvertently entered the wrong radial into their navigation system and went off course. Because of fog in the area, the pilots did not know they were on a collision course with the mountain.

In popular culture 
On February 23, 2008, Globovisón briefly mentioned the accident while covering a report on Santa Bárbara Airlines Flight 518.

Similarities with Santa Barbara Airlines Flight 518 

On February 21, 2008, Santa Bárbara Airlines Flight 518, an ATR 42, crashed into the "Los Conejos" moor, several minutes after taking off from Alberto Carnevalli Airport in Mérida. 43 passengers and three crew members were killed in the accident. The remains of the aircraft were found the following day in a mountain range approximately 10 kilometers northeast of Mérida at an altitude of 12,000 feet (3,700 m). No survivors were found. After the accident, the company started a new public relations program and rebranded SBA Airlines. Like Flight 108, Santa Bárbara Airlines Flight 518 did not have accurate information of the route it was flying.

References

External links 
 
 

20th century in Maracaibo
Aviation accidents and incidents in 1991
Aviation accidents and incidents in Venezuela
Accidents and incidents involving the McDonnell Douglas DC-9
Airliner accidents and incidents caused by pilot error
108
1991 in Venezuela
March 1991 events in South America
1991 disasters in Venezuela
Events in Maracaibo